Elections to Liverpool City Council were held on 22 May 2014.  The election date was delayed from the usual first Thursday in May to coincide with the European Parliament election. Due to the 'in thirds' system of election, one third of the council were up for election, with direct comparisons to previous results made with the corresponding vote at the 2010 Liverpool City Council election
After the election, the composition of the council was:

Election result in 2014

Ward results
* - Existing Councillor seeking re-election.

(PARTY) - Party of former Councillor

Allerton and Hunts Cross

Anfield

Belle Vale

Central

Childwall

Church

Clubmoor

County

Cressington

Croxteth

Everton

Fazakerley

Greenbank

Kensington and Fairfield

Kirkdale

Knotty Ash

Mossley Hill

Norris Green

Old Swan

Picton

Prince's Park

Riverside

St. Michael's

Speke-Garston

Tuebrook & Stoneycroft

Warbreck

Wavertree

West Derby

Woolton

Yew Tree

References

2014
2014 English local elections
2010s in Liverpool